SM 3.0 is the latest business strategy and development plan of the South Korean entertainment company SM Entertainment. Announced in February 2023, it would focus on integrating various aspects of the company's operations, including music production, content creation, and global distribution, into a cohesive system. The plan would aim to expand the company's market presence and enhance its offerings to provide a more comprehensive experience for fans. The implementation of SM 3.0 would involve the development of an intellectual property (IP), business, overseas, and investment system, as well as a multi-production center and label system. These systems were designed to support the company's efforts to optimize its operations and increase its competitiveness in the entertainment industry, particularly in terms of producing content and expanding its market reach.

History 
With the "success" of H.O.T., who debuted in 1996, SM Entertainment became a "pioneer" in the genre of K-pop, led by the company's founder Lee Soo-man, and considered SM 1.0 until 2010, when artists such as H.O.T., BoA, TVXQ, Super Junior, Girls' Generation, and Shinee debuted. Until 2022, Lee made a significant contribution to SM as an executive producer through a contract with the company and created Exo, Red Velvet, NCT, and Aespa, with the company having several people with producing capabilities was described as SM 2.0. Throughout that particular generation, the system was under the governance of the company's general manager Kim Young-min. Additionally, Tak Young-jun stated that during the SM 1.0 and 2.0 systems, SM produced intellectual property (IP) of its artists under the sole leadership of the company's chief producer Lee. By February 3, 2023, it was announced that it would be the first year of SM 3.0.

Development 

In September 2022, Lee Soo-man stepped down from the company and only became a major shareholder of SM Entertainment because of the sentiments expressed by the minority shareholders for him to retire. On February 3, 2023, SM announced the SM 3.0: IP Strategy - Multi 'Production Center/Label' System through its official YouTube channel and homepage. The "strategic" vision of SM 3.0 was considered a "practical" plan for SM, which had declared to enhance shareholder value and improve governance after it terminated the production contract with Lee and commenced a reorganization of the members of the board of directors. SM 3.0 would be promoted based on the intellectual property (IP), business, overseas, and investment system, which would be the future growth engine of the company. The four strategies are detailed as follows:
 Production of "high-quality" IP, which is SM's entertainment business core;
 Business monetization through IP;
 Expansion of IP beyond the local market and internationally;
 Based on the financial performance monetized through IP, investing in new businesses such as global music publishing business, label acquisition, fandom economy business, and the metaverse.
SM also introduced a multi-production center or label system for producing "new, mega" IP crucial for SM 3.0 and will be promoted around the establishment of a multi-production center, multi-label, and music publishing subsidiary. This system in SM 3.0 would maintain the existing accumulated IP production and operation know-how, expand production capabilities, and entrust business decision-making authority to each director through "subjective" artist management to improve IP production quality, being a system that can accelerate the speed and advance the SM standard. Lee Sung-soo stated that SM's existing system had limitations in IP production and operation required by the market and fans and pointed out the meaning of introducing a multi-production center and multi-label. Lee added that by "dispersing and systematizing" multiple production centers and labels, the company could secure its business sustainability in a "competitive" way. The system would produce several entities by way of their respective IPs, and through this, [it would purposely]:

 Secure business sustainability through capacity distribution and systematization;
 Strengthen IP creation by guaranteeing independent decision-making;
 Expand music diversity through respect for autonomy;
 Establish a foundation for "long-term" mutual growth between artists and companies.
Accordingly, SM divided SM artists into "five plus one" (5+1) production centers, where five of the centers would guarantee "independent" decision-making by arranging artist-only production and "essential" functions and show off "improved" IP creation by respecting "creative" autonomy. Additionally, a virtual artist or IP production center would be dedicated to the production and operation management of virtual artists, such as Naevis, to continue its "leading" position in the future entertainment industry represented by the metaverse. The production centers would grow into an in-house label, supporting label independence for artists with "established" musical or business originality, providing independence and opportunities for growth simultaneously, and a reward structure based on performance. SM would also establish a 100% invested music publishing subsidiary to ensure that "high-quality" music would be "evenly" delivered to each production center and label and build an extensive music pool. By signing contracts with composers, lyricists, and international music publishing companies, it planned to grow into another new source of revenue for SM by fostering it as a "unique, global" music publishing company.

In the multi-production center, a separate music selection council called the Artists and Repertoire (A&R) Committee would be created to help produce "quality" music that would fulfill SM's standards. The committee is a consultative body composed of A&R managers from each production center and professionals from organizations under the A&R Headquarters. It would maintain the SM music standard through the joint intelligence of music experts. An IP Committee would also be established separately from the production center to discuss management with its main agenda for concept planning of new artists, which is the phase before being assigned to the production center or label independence for mature artists. The consultative body would consist of production center leaders, a chief financial officer (CFO), and a consulting group composed of "specialized" external organizations, prioritizing IP planning and operation and understanding the market and fans rather than a few company executives and employees.

SM announced it would launch three new groups and a virtual solo artist in 2023, with plans to debut a new girl group in the first quarter, a virtual artist in the second quarter, NCT Tokyo in the third quarter, and a new boy group in the fourth quarter. Lee Sung-soo, Tak Young-jun, and inside director Park Joon-young will each lead the debut project. The company is also anticipated to release more than 40 albums, a 30% increase compared to 2022, and record sales of more than 18 million copies. Furthermore, the company would expand its musical spectrum and strengthen its musical influence by acquiring labels of various genres that SM does not focus on, such as ballad, R&B, and hip-hop. SM also predicted that it would be possible for more than two groups to debut in a year instead of just one group debuting every three-point-five years.

Reception

Criticisms and internal strife 
On February 6, 2023, it was reported that singer and actor Kim Min-jong, who worked for SM Entertainment for 17 years, sent an email to all SM employees on February 5 criticizing the company's announcement of SM 3.0, with the primary goal of ending Lee Soo-man's production. In the entire email, he appealed that the executives, staff, and artists were "shocked" by the announcement of the two co-CEOs and that the statement was not the result of communicating with Lee but an "arbitrary" decision. Kim claimed that contrary to what was announced, Lee Sung-soo and Tak Young-jun, who remarked that they were for Lee Soo-man and the SM family," cut off all contact with the Lee Soo-man and made "one-sided" announcements and farewells without any discussions with the insiders. It was believed that Kim must have felt "betrayed" by the two representatives who had been with Lee for a long time and insisted that Lee's senses were needed for SM and had Lee's life to the company's founding and development should be treated with respect. Following Kim's email, he faced a backlash after criticizing SM's co-CEO over Lee's resignation, and employees at SM expressed their sentiments in favor of the company's production reorganization plan anonymously.

Stock price increase 
The public, industry, and market reactions to SM 3.0 are favorable as it incorporates modifications to improve the efficiency of SM's organizations, including multi-production centers and label systems. With the transition to this new system, expectations were "high" that the organization's "efficient" response to changes in the global music environment would generate results. This system was one of the governance improvement plans agreed upon between SM and Align Partners. SM stock price surpassed 90,000 won for the first time since its listing on the Korea Exchange and is expected to rise "continuously". The improvements in governance structure, "shareholder-friendly" moves, earnings growth based on new growth strategies expectations, and an end with Like Planning contract drove stock prices up.

References

Further reading 
 SM 3.0:Producing Strategy - Multi 'Production Center / Label' System. (2023). [PDF] SM Entertainment. (in English)
 SM 3.0 :IP 전략 - 멀티 '제작센터 / 레이블' 체계 [SM 3.0:IP Strategy - Multi 'Production Center / Label' System]. (2023). [PDF] SM Entertainment.(in Korean)

SM Entertainment
Musical terminology
2023 neologisms
Music-related neologisms